Raba' Hamdan is a sub-district located in Hamdan District, Sana'a Governorate, Yemen. Raba' Hamdan had a population of 29032  according to the 2004 census.

References 

Sub-districts in Hamdan District